Malo Gusto (born 19 May 2003) is a French professional footballer who plays as a right-back, right-midfielder or centre-back for Ligue 1 club Lyon, on loan from Premier League club Chelsea.

Early life 
Malo Gusto was born in Décines-Charpieu – that would eventually become the home of the Parc OL in the Lyon Metropolis.

Growing up in Villefontaine, Isère, his father first made him play rugby, but the young Gusto soon chose to play football, pursuing his dream to become a professional footballer, while studying for a baccalauréat technologique.

Club career

Lyon 
Malo Gusto started playing at the ASVF, later joining Bourgoin-Jallieu on a one-year spell, before entering the Olympique Lyonnais academy as an under-14, in a move resembling the one of his elder academy fellow Amine Gouiri. Gusto so happened to arrive in Lyon the same year that the club moved to the Stade des Lumières, in his home town.

There he was part of the same generation as Florent da Silva, Yaya Soumaré and Rayan Cherki, eventually signing his first professional contract with the French club in December 2021. At that point he had already made a few appearance on the team sheet for Ligue 1 games under Rudi Garcia's management, whilst already having shown his talent in the Youth League and National 2, with the reserve.

Malo Gusto made his professional debut for Olympique Lyonnais on the 24 January 2021, replacing Bruno Guimarães on the 90th minute of a 5–0 Ligue 1 away win against their Derby du Rhône rivals of Saint-Étienne. Having made another short Ligue 1 appearance at the end of the season, the young defender signed a new contract with Lyon in June, tying him to the club until 2024.

During the summer 2021 pre-season, as Peter Bosz had been named head coach by Juninho, Gusto soon appeared as one of Lyon most promising new prospects, along with the likes of Castello Lukeba, even being elected man of the match during a 4–1 friendly win against the Bundesliga side of Wolfsburg.

Starting the 2021–22 season as the official replacement of France international Léo Dubois – as several fullbacks were departing the club, including Mattia De Sciglio, Melvin Bard and Maxwel Cornet – Gusto started his first game during Lyon's opening match against Brest on 7 August. By doing so he became the youngest defender to start a Ligue 1 game for OL since Samuel Umtiti.

While still appearing to be behind Dubois in the right-backs hierarchy, Gusto still took the spotlight on several occasions under Bosz's direction, as he started games such as the 2–0 Europa League away win against Rangers or the 2–1 Ligue 1 away loss against Paris Saint-Germain.

Chelsea 
On 29 January 2023, Chelsea confirmed the signing of Malo Gusto on a deal until 2030. He was loaned back to Lyon until the end of the 2022–23 season.

International career
Born in France, Gusto is of Portuguese descent  through his father, and Martiniquais descent through his mother. He is a youth international for France: he first played as a midfielder for the under-16, but was later selected as a fullback with the U17 and U18. However, he did not play any official game with the later, as the covid pandemic did not allow most youth international encounters or competitions to go on as planned in 2020–2021.

In September 2021, as the pandemic was slowing down, the young defender eventually gained his next French cap, this time playing with the under-19. He was called for a friendly tournament in Slovenia, against Russia, Slovakia and the hosts, along with his teammate Rayan Cherki. There he started and played every minutes of all three games, even ending up wearing the captain's armband.

However only a month later both he and Cherki were directly promoted to the under-21 team, by Sylvain Ripoll. The two of them made their debut coming of the bench with the espoirs on the 8 October 2021, helping their team to an important 5-0 win against Ukraine in the Euro qualifying.

Style of play 
Malo Gusto is seen as a very agile and offensively minded player, ever since playing eight-a-side football at Villefontaine, and he first played as an attacking midfielder or a forward. While he was at the Lyon academy he played in several different positions, including wide midfielder, advanced playmaker, and right winger. He eventually settled as a right-back, where he took full advantage of his notable speed and athleticism.

He is seen as both a very athletic and hard working fullback, who uses his technique and precision of pass to be decisive in the opponent's half.

Career statistics

References

External links
France profile at FFF

2003 births
Living people
French footballers
France under-21 international footballers
France youth international footballers
French people of Portuguese descent
French people of Martiniquais descent
Association football defenders
People from Décines-Charpieu
FC Bourgoin-Jallieu players
Olympique Lyonnais players
Chelsea F.C. players
Ligue 1 players

Championnat National 2 players
Sportspeople from Lyon Metropolis
Footballers from Auvergne-Rhône-Alpes